Eduardo Belmont Anderson (born c. 1945) is a Peruvian billionaire businessman. He is the "owner and president of Belcorp, a door-to-door cosmetics company that operates in 16 Latin American countries and the United States". In 2021, he was worth an estimated $1.1 billion.

References

Living people
1940s births
People from Lima
University of North Carolina at Chapel Hill alumni
Peruvian billionaires
Peruvian businesspeople